Messier 61 (also known as M61 or NGC 4303) is an intermediate barred spiral galaxy in the Virgo Cluster of galaxies. It was first discovered by Barnaba Oriani on May 5, 1779, six days before Charles Messier discovered the same galaxy. Messier had observed it on the same night as Oriani but had mistaken it for a comet. Its distance  has been estimated to be  45.61 million light years from  the Milky Way Galaxy. It is a member of the M61 Group of galaxies, which is a member of the Virgo II Groups, a series of galaxies and galaxy clusters strung out from the southern edge of the Virgo Supercluster.

Properties 
M61 is one of the largest members of Virgo Cluster, and belongs to a smaller subgroup known as the S Cloud. The morphological classification of SAB(rs)bc indicates a weakly-barred spiral (SAB) with the suggestion of a ring structure (rs) and moderate to loosely wound spiral arms. It has an active galactic nucleus and is classified as a starburst galaxy containing a massive nuclear star cluster with an estimated mass of 105 solar masses and an age of 4 million years, as well as a central candidate supermassive black hole weighing around  solar masses.
It cohabits with an older massive star cluster as well as a likely older starburst. Evidence of significant star formation and active bright nebulae appears across M61's disk. Unlike most late-type spiral galaxies within the Virgo Cluster, M61 shows an unusual abundance of neutral hydrogen (H I).

Extragalactic supernovae

Eight extragalactic supernovae have so far been observed in M61, making it one of the most prodigious galaxies for such cataclysmic events. These include: SN 2020jfo, SN 2014dt, SN 2008in, SN 2006ov, SN 1999gn, SN 1964F, SN 1961I, and the first to be observed, the Type II-K SN 1926A, which appeared on 9 May 1926.

Gallery

See also
 List of Messier objects

References

External links

messier.seds.org/m/m061.html

Intermediate spiral galaxies
Messier 061
Messier 061
061
Messier 061
07420
40001
17790505